Chapel Brampton is a village and former civil parish in West Northamptonshire in England. Together with nearby Church Brampton, it is known as The Bramptons. At the time of the 2001 census, Chapel Brampton parish's population was 470 people. At the 2011 census the population was included in the civil parish of Church with Chapel Brampton.

Village
The villages name means 'Broom farm/settlement'.

The village is notable for its distinctive Spencer Estate cottages. These Victorian sandstone cottages are of a similar design to cottages found in the nearby villages of Church Brampton, Harlestone and The Bringtons.

Chapel Brampton has three pubs — the Spencer Arms is a former coaching inn whilst the Brampton Halt was part of the railway station. A new build on the site of the former Boughton cold store is named The Windhover after an old name for the kestrel. This site is actually within the parish of Boughton. The village has two conference centres: Sedgebrook Hall and Brampton Grange. Sedgebrook Grange was designed by architect John Brown and built in 1930 as a wedding gift for a member of the Houison Craufurd family from Craufurdland Castle in Ayrshire.

The (Red) Earl Spencer broke the neck of his favourite horse, Merry Tom, whilst out fox hunting and trying to jump the narrow River Nene. The Earl paid for a monument to be erected at the Brixworth end of what is now known as Merry Tom Lane, engraved 'Here Lies the body of Merry Tom'. A local wag scratched on it: "ridden to death by careless John". Merry Tom Lane was also the site of a level crossing. When the railway is rebuilt a small halt will be built there.

Preserved railway
The nearby railway line is now part of the preserved Northampton & Lamport Railway which has its headquarters at Pitsford and Brampton railway station.

References

External links

 A Tale of Two Villages: A Perambulation of Church with Chapel Brampton by Jack Wagstaff, a long-time resident of Chapel Brampton

Villages in Northamptonshire
West Northamptonshire District
Former civil parishes in Northamptonshire